Avda is an old and rare Russian Christian male first name. It is possibly derived from either the Biblical Hebrew word abdā, meaning (god's) slave, (god's) servant, or the Greek word audē, meaning speech, prophecy.

The patronymics derived from "Avda" are "" (Avdich; masculine) and "" (Avdichna; feminine).

"Avda" is also a colloquial form of the male first names Avdakt and Avdiky and a diminutive of the male first names Avdey and Avdon.

References

Notes

Sources
Н. А. Петровский (N. A. Petrovsky). "Словарь русских личных имён" (Dictionary of Russian First Names). ООО Издательство "АСТ". Москва, 2005. 
[1] А. В. Суперанская (A. V. Superanskaya). "Современный словарь личных имён: Сравнение. Происхождение. Написание" (Modern Dictionary of First Names: Comparison. Origins. Spelling). Айрис-пресс. Москва, 2005. 
[2] А. В. Суперанская (A. V. Superanskaya). "Словарь русских имён" (Dictionary of Russian Names). Издательство Эксмо. Москва, 2005.